Bobek is a surname. Notable people with the surname include:

Filip Bobek (born 1980), Polish actor
Gaspard Bobek (1593–1635), Croatian bishop
Hans Bobek (1903−1990), Austrian geographer
Karl Bobek (1855–1899), German mathematician
Michal Bobek (born 1977), Czech judge and legal scholar 
Miroslav Bobek (born 1967), Czech natural scientist 
Nicole Bobek (born 1977), retired American figure skater
Pavel Bobek (1937–2013), Czech singer
Stjepan Bobek (1923−2010), Croatian football striker and manager

Also diminutive of name Robert:
Robert Lewandowski (born 1988), Polish footballer

See also
 

Slavic-language surnames